Huo Lina (born 30 March 1973) is a Chinese ice hockey player. She competed in the women's tournament at the 1998 Winter Olympics.

References

1973 births
Living people
Chinese women's ice hockey players
Olympic ice hockey players of China
Ice hockey players at the 1998 Winter Olympics
Place of birth missing (living people)
Asian Games gold medalists for China
Asian Games bronze medalists for China
Medalists at the 1999 Asian Winter Games
Medalists at the 2007 Asian Winter Games
Ice hockey players at the 1999 Asian Winter Games
Ice hockey players at the 2007 Asian Winter Games
Asian Games medalists in ice hockey